Cumback is an unincorporated community in Daviess County, Indiana, in the United States.

History
A post office was established at Cumback in 1881, and remained in operation until it was discontinued in 1905. The community was named for William Cumback, a U.S. Representative from Indiana.

References

Unincorporated communities in Daviess County, Indiana
Unincorporated communities in Indiana